Bibiodes halteralis is a species of March flies in the family Bibionidae.

References

Bibionidae
Articles created by Qbugbot
Insects described in 1904
Taxa named by Daniel William Coquillett